Christoffer Kläfford (born 10 April 1989) is a Swedish singer, born in Ramsberg, Sweden.

Career 
Kläfford began his music career performing for 10 years in small bars. In 2017, however, Kläfford won the thirteenth season of the Swedish Idol series. Kläfford has a total of three top five singles on national radio in a year and more than 35 million streams, platinum sales and sold-out concerts. He's the only winner having both the #1 and #7 most streaming singles at the same time. In the summer of 2018, he embarked on a tour consisting of 50 shows in Sweden. In 2019, Kläfford toured in Sweden together with the band Gyllene Tider on their farewell tour.

Kläfford participated in the 14th series of America's Got Talent, broadcast in 2019, where his first song choice was John Lennons "Imagine", which he also sang in the Idol finale. His performance of "Imagine" is one of the most viewed videos on his YouTube channel. He was eliminated in the semifinals.

Discography

Extended plays

Singles

Other charted songs

References

21st-century Swedish singers
21st-century Swedish male singers
Living people
1989 births
America's Got Talent contestants
Idol (Swedish TV series) winners
People from Örebro